The Novena is a Canadian drama film, directed by Bernard Émond and released in 2005.

An exploration of faith, the film centres on the interaction between Jeanne (Élise Guilbault), an atheist doctor who is suffering from clinical depression and wants to commit suicide after one of her patients is murdered by an abusive husband, and François (Patrick Drolet), a young, deeply religious man who is fervently praying for a miracle to save his dying grandmother. The film is the first in a trilogy inspired by the Catholic theological virtues of faith, hope and charity, which continued with Summit Circle (Contre toute espérance) in 2007 and The Legacy (La Donation) in 2009.

Cast
 Élise Guilbault as Jeanne
 Patrick Drolet as François
 Marie-Josée Bastien as Bénévole refuge
 Claude Binet as M. Tremblay
 Luc Bourgeois as Urgentologue
 Lise Castonguay as Thérèse
 Richard Champagne as Agent de sécurité
 Pierre Collin as Prêtre confident
 Benoît Dagenais as Docteur Langlais
 Stéphane Demers as Mari de Lise
 Raoul Desmeules as Un aide
 Muriel Dutil as Mère de Jeanne
 Denise Gagnon as Grand-mère
 Amélie Grenier as Femme du refuge
 Éveline Gélinas as Jeune mère qui témoigne
 Paul Hébert as Prêtre qui bénit
 Bonfield Marcoux as Curé du village
 Guillaume Meloche as Patient urgence
 Isabelle Pastena as Femme du refuge
 Micheline Poitras as Femme du refuge
 Lyne Riel as Femme du refuge
 Isabelle Roy as Lise
 Paul Savoie as Mari de Jeanne
 Michelle Sirois as Infirmière urgence (billed as Michèle Sirois)
 Jean-François Sénécal as Agent de sécurité
 Diane Verreault as Ambulancier
 Ghislaine Vincent as Madame Filion

Accolades
It premiered at the Locarno Film Festival in 2005, where it won three awards including Best Actor for Drolet. In December 2005, it was named to the Toronto International Film Festival's annual Canada's Top Ten list of the year's best films.

The film did not receive any Genie Award nominations, as its distributor deliberately chose not to submit the film at all. It received eight Prix Jutra nominations, including Best Film, Best Director (Émond), Best Actor (Drolet), Best Actress (Guilbault), Best Screenplay (Émond), Best Cinematography (Jean-Claude Labrecque), Best Editing (Louise Côté) and Best Music (Robert Marcel Lepage). Guilbault won the Jutra for Best Actress.

References

External links

2005 films
Canadian drama films
Films directed by Bernard Émond
French-language Canadian films
2000s Canadian films